Florence Quentin (5 September 1946) is a French César Award winning director and screenwriter. She mostly work with Catherine Jacob and Étienne Chatiliez.

Filmography

References

External links
 

1946 births
French women screenwriters
Film directors from Paris
Living people